Shakespeare and the Goddess of Complete Being is a book of literary criticism by Ted Hughes extensively analyzing the works of Shakespeare.
 Part one: The Immature Phase of the Tragic Equation
 Part two: The Evolution of the Tragic Equation through the Seven Tragedies
 Part three: The Transformation of the Tragic Equation in the Last Plays
The book also provides an insight into Ted Hughes' gender attitudes.

References

External links
 "Shakespeare as shaman", review by C. H. Sisson, The New Criterion, December 1992

1992 non-fiction books
English non-fiction books
Books of literary criticism
Works by Ted Hughes
Works about William Shakespeare
Faber and Faber books